Monostiolum harryleei is a species of sea snail, a marine gastropod mollusk in the family Pisaniidaes.

Description

Distribution
This marine species occurs in the Gulf of Mexico.

References

 García E.F. 2006. Six new species of mollusks (Gastropoda: Cerithioidea, Buccinoidea, Muricoidea) from Bahía de Campeche, southwestern Gulf of Mexico. Novapex 7(4): 77–89

External links
  Watters, G. T. (2009). A revision of the western Atlantic Ocean genera Anna, Antillophos, Bailya, Caducifer, Monostiolum, and Parviphos, with description of a new genus, Dianthiphos, and notes on Engina and Hesperisternia Gastropoda: Buccinidae: Pisaniinae) and Cumia (Colubrariidae). The Nautilus. 123(4): 225–275
  Rosenberg, G.; Moretzsohn, F.; García, E. F. (2009). Gastropoda (Mollusca) of the Gulf of Mexico, Pp. 579–699 in: Felder, D.L. and D.K. Camp (eds.), Gulf of Mexico–Origins, Waters, and Biota. Texas A&M Press, College Station, Texas

Pisaniidae
Gastropods described in 2006